The following is a list of North Carolina weather records. North Carolina is located on the Atlantic Coast in the Southern United States. Since it has the Appalachian Mountains on the western part of the state, and the ocean on the east, North Carolina has experienced many different weather conditions.

Temperature

Overall

Precipitation

Rain

Snow

Hurricanes

See also
 Climate of North Carolina
 List of weather records

References

External links
 State Climate Office of North Carolina

List of weather records
Lists of weather records
American records
Weather records